Pheidole acutidens is a species of ant in the genus Pheidole. It is endemic to Argentina.

References

acutidens
Fauna of Argentina
Endemic fauna of Argentina
Hymenoptera of South America
Insects described in 1922
Taxa named by Felix Santschi
Taxonomy articles created by Polbot